Tommaso Aversa (16231663) was an Italian Baroque poet and dramatist.

Biography 
Tommaso Aversa was born in Mistretta, Sicily, in 1623. Early in life he moved to Palermo, where he diligently studied literature. It's unknown which profession he was supposed to pursue during his youth. Poetry and drama, however, soon became his main interests, as a consequence of the exclusion of any other study.

He was still very young when the publication of “Pyramus and Thisbe,” a graceful idyll in the Sicilian language, was favorably accepted by the public. The literati of Palermo readily acknowledged the young poet, for his amiable manners and his devotion to the muses. He was enrolled as a member of the “Accademia dei Riaccesi,” although with the ill-sounding and inappropriate name of L’Arido (the Arid). Aversa rapidly rose to prominence; both intellectuals and aristocrats respected him, and among his patrons and friends in Palermo there were Cardinal Archbishop, Giannettino Doria, Luigi Moncada, Duke of Montalto, and Diego of Aragon, Duke of Terranova. Aversa became so close to the latter that, at his particular request, he accompanied the Duke to Spain. From Spain, they traveled to Vienna and Rome. Don Diego always acted as an ambassador of the king of Spain, and Aversa was immediately introduced to some of the most distinguished men in Europe. In Rome, he became a member of “Umoristi” and “Anfistili”, where he was known as L’Esaltato (the Exalted).

After his wife's death, Aversa took holy orders. After his consecration, he immediately returned to Palermo and was designated chaplain of Santa Maria del Fornice by the new Archbishop, Pietro Jerónimo Martínez y Rubio.
From that moment until the end of his life, he devoted himself with more intensity than ever to literary occupations, and, considering the number of his works, his industriousness seems astonishing. He died of apoplexy on April 3, 1663.

Writings 

Among Aversa’s works, the greatest is a translation of the Aeneid of Virgil into Sicilian rhymes. Most of the rest of his operas are tragedies or comedies.

The following is a list of his works in order of date of composition:

 “Piramo e Tisbe,” an idyll in the Sicilian language, Palermo, 1617, 8vo.
 “Gli Avventurosi Intrichi, Commedia,” Palermo, 1637, 8vo.
 “La notti di Palermu” (Night in Palermo, 1638), later published in Italian as Notte, fato, e amore in la corte delle selve (1657), is considered to be the first comedy composed entirely in Sicilian dialect.
 “Il Pellegrino, overo la Sfinge debellata, tragedia sacra,” Palermo, 1641, 8vo.
 “Il Giorno di Messina, Comedia,” Messina 1644, 8vo.
 “Il Sebastiano, tragedia sacra Palermo,” 1645, 8vo.
 “Canzoni Siciliane,” inserted in vol. II part. 2 of the collection entitled “Muse Siciliane,” Palermo, 1647, 12mo, and 1662, 12mo.
 “In portento canzone panegirica all’Illustriss. et Eccel. Signore Conte Guglielmo Stavata, Consigliero di Stato, e Camariero di Sua Maestà Cesarea,” Vienna, 1647, 4to.
 “Il Bartolomeo, overo il Selim Costante, tragedia,” Messina, 1645, 8vo, and Trent, 1648, 8vo.
 “Il primo tomo dell’Eneide di Virgilio tradotta in rima Siciliana,” Palermo, 1654, 12mo. “Il secondo tomo,” Palermo, 1657, 12mo. “II terzo tomo,” Palermo 1660 12mo.
 “Il Padre Pietoso, comedia morale,” Rome, 1656, 12mo.
 “L’Alipio, overo la colomba fra le Palme, poema drammatico sopra il maraviglioso arrivo dell’osse benedette del P.F. Alipio di S. Giuseppe Agostiniano Scalzo Palermitano, alle Spiaggie di Palma in Sicilia, l’anno 1653,” Rome, 1657, 12mo.
 “La Corte nelle Selve, Trattenimenti modesti ed utili, distinti in più veglie per gli dì di Carnivale. Con gli discorsi di Tomino Amistrato (T. Aversa), ed osservationi di lui sopra la comedia titolata Notte, Fato ed Amore,” with the comedy itself at the end, Rome, 1657, 12mo.
 “Idea, overo ordine delle scene per la rappresentatione della tragedia del Sebastiano: con un discorso academico detto: Disinganno,” Rome, 1659.
 “L’Ormindo, tragicomedia reale per la felice nascita del Serenissimo Infante D. Carlo Giuseppe d’Austria, Prencipe della Spagne,” with a reprint of the “Disinganno” attached, Palermo, 1662, 12mo.

References

Bibliography 
  
 
 Leo Allatius, Drammaturgia, Rome 1666, pp. 488, 627;
 Antonio Mongitore, Bibliotheca sicula, II, Panormi 1714, p. 254;
 Giuseppe Emanuele Ortolani, Biografia degli uomini illustri della Sicilia, II, Naples 1818, pp. 13–16;
 Rosalia La Porta-Parlato, Note sul teatro popolare siciliano, Palermo 1917, pp. 47–52;
 Concetta Pasculli, Il teatro in Sicilia nel Seicento, Reggio Calabria 1922, pp. 26–30, 57 s.;
 Enrico Di Marzo, La nuova scuola poetica dialettale siciliana, Palermo 1924, pp. 51 s.;
 Giuseppe Cocchiara, Tommaso Aversa e il teatro sacro in Sicilia, Palermo s. d.;
 Giuseppe Cocchiara, Le vastasate. Contributo alla storia del teatro popolare, Palermo 1926, pp. 25 s.;
 Giuseppe Sorge, I teatri di Palermo nei secoli XVI-XVII-XVIII, Palermo 1926, pp. 126 s., 137 s., 151 s., 176 s.;
 Diz. dei siciliani illustri, Palermo 1939, p. 52;
 Francesco De Felice, Storia del teatro siciliano, Catania 1956, p. 19;
 Teatro siciliano, a cura di A. Mango (con introduz. di V. Pandolfi), I, Palermo 1961, pp. XIV s., 23-61.

1623 births
1663 deaths
17th-century Italian poets
Writers from Sicily
17th-century Italian dramatists and playwrights
Italian male poets
Writers from Palermo
17th-century Italian male writers
Italian male dramatists and playwrights
Baroque writers